Éric Straumann (born 17 August 1964 in Colmar) is a French politician of the Republicans who served as a member of the National Assembly from 2007 until 2020, representing the Haut-Rhin department.

Political career 
Straumann was a member of the Union for a Popular Movement before joining the Republicans.

In parliament, Straumann served on the Committee on Legal Affairs (2007-2012), the Committee on Economic Affairs (2012-2020), and the Committee on European Affairs (2017-2020).

In addition to his committee assignments, Straumann was briefly a substitute member of the French delegation to the Parliamentary Assembly of the Council of Europe (PACE) in 2020, where he served on the Committee on Migration, Refugees and Displaced Persons.

On 4 July 2020, Straumann was appointed Mayor of Colmar.  This triggered the accumulation of mandates rule, so he  left the National Assembly.  His substitute candidate, Brigitte Klinkert, was Minister Delegate for Economic Inclusion, so a by-election was called for his constituency.  The by-election was won by Yves Hemedinger.

Political positions
In the Republicans' 2016 presidential primaries, Straumann publicly endorsed Bruno Le Maire as the party's candidate for the 2017 French presidential election. Ahead of the party's 2017 leadership election, he supported Laurent Wauquiez as new chairman.

Notes

References

1964 births
Living people
People from Colmar
Union for a Popular Movement politicians
The Republicans (France) politicians
Deputies of the 13th National Assembly of the French Fifth Republic
Deputies of the 14th National Assembly of the French Fifth Republic
Deputies of the 15th National Assembly of the French Fifth Republic
Mayors of places in Grand Est